Teams affiliated with Hull City A.F.C. include Hull City A.F.C. Juniors and Hull City A.F.C. Reserves.

Hull City A.F.C. Reserves

Hull City Reserves play in The Final Third Development League, the oldest reserve league in England, East Division. They play their home fixtures at Grange Lane in nearby North Ferriby, the home ground of Conference North club North Ferriby United. They won the Final Third Development League East Division title 2013–14, as well as being crowned overall champions of the Final Third Development League by virtue of having the most points out of all competing teams. This is the second time Hull City Reserves have won the title, the first being the 2004–05 season. They also won the League Cup during the 2002–03 season. The team also competes in the U21 Premier League Cup where in 2013–14 they reached the round of 32, losing 3–1 to Blackburn Rovers Reserves. The team also takes part in the East Riding County Cup.

Competition

League: The Final Third Development League East Division
Cup: League Cup
Cup: U21 Premier League Cup
Cup: East Riding County Cup

Hull City A.F.C. Juniors

Hull City Juniors play in the Puma Youth Alliance, playing their home fixtures at Winterton Rangers F.C.'s home stadium. 

Recently the juniors have had a successful 2006–07 season, winning the league title by a 10-point margin. They also reached the fourth round of the FA Youth Cup, losing 2-1 to eventual semi-finalists Arsenal Juniors. In 2007-08 they retained the league title and also won the Puma Youth Alliance Cup. Jamie Devitt was named Young Player Of The Year.

Players included:
 Yann Ekra  (ST, Ivory Coast)
 Jamie Devitt (MF, Republic Of Ireland)
 Darragh Satelle (MF/ST, Republic Of Ireland)
 James Finlay (GK, England)

Players 
.

Development squad

Notable former Hull City A.F.C. Reserves and Juniors Players
  Ben Wilkinson
  Clayton Donaldson
 Conor Townsend
 Daniel James
  Danny East
  Danny Emerton
  Dean Windass
  Gary Bradshaw
  James Bennett
  Jamie Devitt
 Jonny Margetts
 Josh Clackstone
  Josh Tymon
  Liam Cooper
  Mark Cullen
  Matt Plummer
 Max Clark
  Michael Byron
  Nathan Peat
  Nicky Featherstone
  Russell Fry
  Ryan Kendall
  Scott Wiseman
  Simon Russell
  Sonny Bradley
  Steve Burton
  Tom Cairney
  Will Atkinson
  Yann Ekra
  Daniel Batty
  Jack Barmby
  Jarrod Bowen
  Keane Lewis-Potter
  Brandon Fleming
  Jacob Greaves
  Harvey Cartwright

Affiliated teams

Hull City Women A.F.C.

Hull City Women play in the Northern Combination Women's Football League. In the 2006–07 season, the team finished seventh in the table with 33 points.

Hull City

Hull City are the main team who finished 3rd in the Championship in season 2007-08 and were promoted to the Premier League after winning the play-offs.

References

External links
Youth Team Squad 2008/09 at hullcityafc.net

Reserves
Football academies in England
North Regional League